Palaquium galactoxylum, commonly known as Cairns pencil cedar, Daintree maple or red silkwood, is a species of very large tree in the family Sapotaceae which is endemic to rainforests of New Guinea and northern Australia. It can produce spectacularly large buttress roots.

Description
The trunk, branches and leaves all exude a milky sap when cut. It is semi-deciduous, dropping its leaves for a short period around October.

The leaf-bearing twigs are scarred and rough looking; young twigs and new shoots are clothed in fine brown hairs. Leaves are glabrous and clustered towards the end of the twigs.

The inflorescences are axillary, produced on the leaf-bearing twigs below the leaves.

Taxonomy
The taxonomy of this species has a somewhat convoluted history with a number of authors describing it and assigning various names. The name currently accepted by most authorities is Palaquium galactoxylum (F.Muell.) H.J.Lam, with combinations by Henri Ernest Baillon, Cyril Tenison White, Pieter van Royen, George Bentham, and even a second description published by Ferdinand von Mueller all being discarded.

In Australian botany, the species' accepted name is Palaquium galactoxylon.

Subspecies
 the subspecies Palaquium galactoxylum var salmonense (C.T.White) P.Royen is accepted by the Papua New Guinea National Herbarium, the Global Biodiversity Information Facility, and World Flora Online, but is not accepted by Plants of the World Online or Catalogue of Life which consider this infraspecies to be a synonym.

Etymology
The genus name Palaquium comes from the Philippine word palakihun meaning "to let grow". The species epithet is from Ancient Greek galacto- (milky), and -xylon (wood, timber), referring to the copious white sap the plant produces.

Distribution and habitat

Ecology
Fruits of this species are eaten by cassowaries and fruit doves, including the Torresian imperial pigeon.

Conservation
P. galactoxylum has no immediate threats, being relatively common and having a broad distribution. It is therefore listed as least concern by both the IUCN and the Queensland Department of Environment and Science.

Uses
This tree produces a useful hardwood timber which is sold as "Pencil Cedar".

Gallery

References

External links
 
 
 View a map of historical sightings of this species at the Australasian Virtual Herbarium
 View observations of this species on iNaturalist
 See images of this species on Flickriver

galactoxylum
Flora of Papuasia
Flora of Australia
Plants described in 1868
Plants described in 1925
Taxa named by Ferdinand von Mueller
Taxa named by Herman Johannes Lam